Chiliquín is one of 21 Peruvian districts that form the Province of Chachapoyas in the Amazon region. Chiliquin is located in the high mountain. Chiliquin offers several attractive places for tourists like ruins and cataracts. There is a church in the center of the village. There is no highway connection to the village.

The anniversary of the foundation of the district is celebrated on May 3. The purtumute is swallowed cooked between other meals.

Chiliquin shares its border with the District of Asunción (Chachapoyas) to the north, with the District of Quinjalca (Chachapoyas) to the east, the District of Sonche (Chachapoyas) to the south, the District of Valera to the south-west, and the District of Jumbilla (Chachapoyas) to the west.

Districts of the Chachapoyas Province
Districts of the Amazonas Region